Mahmudabad-e Pain may refer to:
 Mahmudabad-e Pain, Razavi Khorasan